Sir Frederick Francis Baker, 2nd Baronet (1772–1830) was a Fellow of the Royal Society.

Life
He was the son of Sir George Baker, 1st Baronet, physician to George III, born 13 May 1772 in Westminster. Educated at Eton College,
St John's College, Cambridge and Balliol College, Oxford (B.A. 1792, M.A. 1796), he was elected to the Royal Society in 1811. He died in a windmill accident near Hastings, on 1 October 1830.

Family
Baker married in 1814 Harriet Simeon, youngest daughter of Sir John Simeon, 1st Baronet. They had three sons:
Sir George Baker, 3rd Baronet
Frederick Francis
A son born in 1826

and a daughter Jane Maria, who in 1840 married the future Sir John Simeon, 3rd Baronet.

Notes

1772 births
1830 deaths
Alumni of Balliol College, Oxford
Alumni of St John's College, Cambridge
Baronets in the Baronetage of Great Britain
Fellows of the Royal Society
People educated at Eton College